is a Japanese rock band from Chiba, formed in 2007. The band consists of Noko (lead vocals, guitar, keyboards, programming, composition), Mono (leader, keyboards, programming, tambourine), and Misako (drums). They describe themselves as an "Internet Pop Rock Band", which reflects the blend of pop melodies and piano with dark lyrics and punk rock sensibilities found within their music, as well as the band's long history of broadcasting both live performances and aspects of their daily lives on the Internet.

History 
The band have grown an organic fanbase through live streams and the online publication of home-made music videos, which is unusual in Japan. They released their debut studio album, on 10 March 2010, on the indie label Perfect Music, which is run by their management company of the same name. Their first single, was released on 7 July 2010.

They later gained a deal with major label Warner Music Japan, and released their major label debut album  on 22 December 2010. On the same day, they also released the album  on Perfect Music.

In 2011, the group performed the opening theme song for the Japanese anime series Ground Control to Psychoelectric Girl, titled . Vocals were provided by voice actress Asuka Ōgame, and a single was released on 27 April 2011, under the name Erio wo Kamattechan. On 31 August 2011, they released their fourth studio album, .

The fictional movie , revolving around a dramatized version of the band with the members played by themselves, was directed by Yu Irie and released by Spotted Productions in Japan on 2 April 2011. The film had its international premiere at the 2011 New York Asian Film Festival, with the English title Ringing in Their Ears.

In March 2012, the group released a single in collaboration with B.B.Queens under the name B.B. Kamattechan, covering the group's 1993 single . This was followed by the group's first major original single  in October 2012, and the release of their fifth studio album, on 14 November 2012.

The following year saw lead vocalist, guitarist, and composer Noko engage in solo activities, contributing vocals to an opening theme of the 2013 anime adaptation of the Japanese manga The Flowers of Evil, and releasing a solo album, . The album, sharing its title with the band's name, was released on 11 September 2013, and contained self-covers with new arrangements of Shinsei Kamattechan songs.

In March 2014, the group released a DVD containing live footage from the years 2009 - 2013, titled , followed by their second major single in April, featuring vocals by Makoto Kawamoto. Their sixth album was released on 10 September 2014, titled .

Celebrating five years since their CD debut, the band released , their first "best of" compilation album, in 2015. It contained tracks selected from each of their six previous studio albums, with the limited edition of the release containing live footage and additional tracks, covered by artists such as Dempagumi.inc, Sumire Uesaka, and tofubeats.

2016 saw the release of the group's first new original content in two years, their seventh studio album, released on 6 July. In an effort to promote the album, the members climbed Mount Fuji in costumed attire during a live broadcast on the streaming website TwitCasting, reaching the peak on 1 July.

In April 2017, their song  was used as the ending theme song for the second season of the anime series Attack on Titan. The song was released as the double A-Side single  under the Pony Canyon label in May 2017, with cover art illustrated by Attack on Titan manga artist Hajime Isayama. Their eighth studio album was released on 6 September 2017, with the title .

The group's song "Front Memory" was chosen to serve as the theme song for the 2018 live-action theatrical adaptation of the Japanese manga After the Rain, covered by singer Emiko Suzuki and arranged by Seiji Kameda, with band members Noko and Mono additionally contributing to the film's soundtrack.
Their 9th studio album, was released on 4 July 2018, with the song  featuring vocals by Regal Lily vocalist and guitarist Honoka Takahashi.

The DVD was sold online and at live venues during the tour, held from 18 to 29 March 2019, with the title .

In August 2019, the band released the digital single , followed by another digital single in October, titled , which was tied to a promotional campaign with music streaming service Spotify. Their 10th album, was released on digital platforms and streaming services in November 2019, with the physical version being released later on 8 January 2020.

2020 saw the band's lineup change for the first time since 2008, with bassist Chibagin announcing the previous year his intention to withdraw from the band after the conclusion of his final tour in January 2020. In an interview, Chibagin explained his decision to withdraw from the band as being the result of concerns over financial security, expressing his desire to find a stable source of income in order to support his family. His final performance with Shinsei Kamattechan, held on 13 January 2020, would go on to receive a video release, released in November 2020, titled . The band's first tour with their new lineup was scheduled to commence in March 2020, however due to precautions taken to prevent the spread of COVID-19, the tour was postponed until July 2020, with the original dates being replaced by their first entirely online tour, broadcast live from a recording studio. In December 2020, the band returned to perform for the fourth and final season of the anime series Attack on Titan, with their song  serving as the season's opening theme. The song was released as a digital single on 22 February 2021 under Pony Canyon Inc., with the cover art once again illustrated by  Attack on Titan manga artist Hajime Isayama.

Media attention 
Shinsei Kamattechan have received a lot of media attention in Japan, although Noko rarely does interviews. The band particularly drew attention for Noko's erratic behaviour during an August 2011 television appearance on TBS music program ComingSoon!!, with host Masahiro Nakai described by media outlets as being "thrown off balance", however they were invited back to the program for a second appearance in September 2011.

They have also attracted attention from English-language media. They were interviewed (without Noko) in a video on the website of British magazine NME at Summer Sonic 2010, and by The Japan Times newspaper, and their debut album, Tomodachi wo Koroshite Made, was reviewed by Metropolis magazine.

Broadcasts 
The band is well known for broadcasting their activity on live streaming video sites such as stickam, PeerCast, TwitCasting, and Japanese popular video sharing website Niconico. The broadcasting methods of band lead Noko are particularly notorious, who gained attention for the live broadcast of an unauthorized performance in front of Shibuya Station, and the subsequent intervention of local law enforcement, in 2010.

Band members 
 Current members
  — leader, keyboards, programming, tambourine
  — lead vocals, guitar, keyboards, programming, song composition
  — drums

 Support members
  — bass, chorus

 Former members
  — guitar, bass
  — bass
  — bass, chorus

Discography

Albums

Compilations

Singles

Collaborations

Awards and nominations

References

External links 
  
 Shinsei Kamattechan discography at Discogs
 Official label profile
 Official management agency profile

2007 establishments in Japan
Crunchyroll Anime Awards winners
Japanese alternative rock groups
Japanese rock music groups
Japanese pop music groups
Musical groups established in 2007
Musical groups from Chiba Prefecture